List of emperors of the Jin dynasty may refer to:

 Emperors of the Western and Eastern Jin dynasties (/, Jìn Cháo; 3rd–5th century)
 Emperors of the Later Jin (/, Hòujìn; 10th century)
 Emperors of the Jurchen Jin dynasty (Jīn Cháo; 12th–13th century)
 Emperors of the Qing dynasty, founded by Nurachi as the Later Jin (/, Hòujīn; 17th century)